Cement is the fourth album by the American band Die Kreuzen, released in 1991 through Touch and Go Records. It was the band's final album.

Production
The album was produced by Butch Vig. It was recorded in the summer of 1991 at Smart Studios, in Madison, Wisconsin. The songs emerged out of musical jams, with Dan Kubinski writing most of the lyrics.

Critical reception
The Washington Post wrote: "Less monomaniacal than previously but no less urgent, Die Kreuzen turns almost lyrical with its latest album."

Track listing 
 	
Gone Away (Acoustic) is an uncredited, hidden track on the CD.

Personnel 
Die Kreuzen
Keith Brammer – bass guitar
Brian Egeness – guitar, piano
Dan Kubinski – vocals
Erik Tunison – drums
Production and additional personnel
Die Kreuzen – production
Butch Vig – production, recording

References

External links 
 

Die Kreuzen albums
1991 albums
Touch and Go Records albums
Albums produced by Butch Vig